WUAG (103.1 FM) is a radio station broadcasting a variety format. Licensed to Greensboro, North Carolina, United States, the station serves the Piedmont Triad area.  The station is currently owned by the University of North Carolina at Greensboro.

History

Since 1964 this college radio station has been through several changes. The station has changed location and frequency three times. First, it was 89.9 (a frequency that had been abandoned by Greensboro's Grimsley High School), then 106.1 in 1981, then by 1990 had changed to what it is today, 103.1 FM. WUAG currently broadcasts at 18 watts, but that is enough to reach  Greensboro. For 25 years prior to 2007, WUAG was located in the UNCG theater building. After the Brown Building's renovation, WUAG moved there and now has a modern studio and offices. , Sarah Dawkins is the General Manager.

Programming
The official format of WUAG is Progressive but with a philosophy of "willful eclecticism and minimal musical boundaries". During the weekday business hours the station plays a constantly changing rotation of everything from Americana, punk, electronica, reggae, hip-hop, rock, jazz, local and world music. During the night hours (7pm-1am) and weekend the station airs specialty shows that focus on a specific genre of music. Since WUAG is primarily student-run it has to adapt each semester to the influx of new DJs who may have more of an interest in one type of music over the other. Examples of Specialty programming are the '80s shows and the Night Zoo, a top 40-leaning show that aired through the early-to-mid '90s.

In 2010, music director Matt Northrup said WUAG had 85 CDs in "heavy rotation", and 15 to 20 new recordings each week, introduced on Northrup's weekly show on Thursday afternoons. WUAG had 100 student DJs, who were told "Less talk, more rock" (though the musical genres varied) and to play eight cuts per hour from the CDs in rotation.

Operations
The day-to-day operations of WUAG are led entirely by students, through a student executive board. The board is staffed with a music director, program director, sports director, news director, and promotions/productions director. Along with the changes each semester of DJs, the student executive board changes each year as well.

References

External links

University of North Carolina at Greensboro
Freeform radio stations
UAG
UAG
Radio stations established in 1965